6200 is a natural number in the 6001-6999 range, and a harmonic divisor number.

It can also refer to: 
 6200 BC, a century in the 7th millennium BC
 AD 6200, the year in the 7th millennium
 6200 BC event, a period of major climatic change
 6200GT, a graphic processing unit 
 6200 Hachinohe, a main belt asteroid 
 PRR 6200, a steam turbine locomotive of the Pennsylvania Railroad
 LMS 6200, a Princess Royal Class steam locomotive of the London Midland and Scottish Railway